Riley Lake is a Dispersed rural community and unincorporated place in geographic Ryde Township in the town of Gravenhurst, District Municipality of Muskoka, in Central Ontario, Canada. The community lies on the northwest shore of the eponymous Riley Lake, the source of Riley Creek.

References

 

Communities in the District Municipality of Muskoka